In enzymology, a L-lysine oxidase is an enzyme that catalyzes the chemical reaction

L-lysine + O2 + H2O  6-amino-2-oxohexanoate + NH3 + H2O2

The 3 substrates of this enzyme are L-lysine, O2, and H2O, whereas its 3 products are 6-amino-2-oxohexanoate, NH3, and H2O2.

This enzyme belongs to the family of oxidoreductases, specifically those acting on the CH-NH2 group of donors with oxygen as acceptor.  The systematic name of this enzyme class is L-lysine:oxygen 2-oxidoreductase (deaminating). Other names in common use include L-lysine alpha-oxidase, and L-lysyl-alpha-oxidase.  This enzyme participates in lysine degradation.

References

 
 

EC 1.4.3
Enzymes of unknown structure